Fritz Emil Irrgang (born May 10, 1890, in Linderode – died December 16, 1951, in Northeim) was a German politician and member of the Nazi Party and the Sturmabteilung (SA).

Irrgang joined the Nazi Party in 1929, joining the SA at the same time, an organisation in which he subsequently attained the rank of Standartenführer. In 1933 he was elected to the Reichstag as a member for the Province of Westphalia and he served as a member of that body until the collapse of Nazism in 1945. He also served as Bürgermeister of a number of German towns during the Nazi period, notably Recklinghausen from 1939 to 1945.

Following the Second World War Irrgang joined the Free Democratic Party and served as the chairman of a local government committee for that party.

References

1890 births
1951 deaths
Nazi Party politicians
Sturmabteilung officers
Members of the Reichstag of Nazi Germany
Free Democratic Party (Germany) politicians
People from Żary County
Members of the Reichstag of the Weimar Republic
People from the Province of Brandenburg